Northey may refer to:

Surname
Alfred Northey (1838–1911), English clergyman and cricketer
Andy Northey (born 1972), English rugby league and rugby union player
Benjamin Northey (born 1970), Australian conductor
Bill Northey (born 1959), Iowan politician, a member of the Republican Party
Craig Northey (born 1962), Canadian musician, film and TV composer
Edward Northey (barrister) (1652–1743), senior British barrister and politician
Edward Northey (British Army officer), GCMG, CB (1868–1953), senior British Army officer of the First World War
Gavin Northey, senior lecturer in marketing at Griffith University Gold Coast Campus
George Northey (cricketer) (1835–1906), English cricketer and soldier
John Northey (born 1943), former Australian rules football player and coach
Richard Northey, ONZM (born 1945), New Zealand politician
Ron Northey (1920–1971), American professional baseball player and coach
Sarah Northey, British silver medalist in synchronized swimming at the 1990 Commonwealth Games
Scott Northey (born 1946), American baseball player
William Northey (1872–1963), Canadian hockey player
William Northey FRS (1722–1770), English politician

Middle name
Neville Northey Burnard (1818–1878), Cornish sculptor best known for his portrait figures
Henry Northey Hooper (1799–1865), 19th-century American manufacturer of decorative lighting, Civil War artillery, bells and chimes
William Northey Hooper (1809–1878), co-founder in 1835 of Ladd & Co., the first large scale sugar producer in Hawaii
Frank Northey Sleeman or Frank Sleeman (1915–2000), Lord Mayor of Brisbane from 1976 to 1982
Lewis Northey Tappan (1831–1880), abolitionist, politician, and Colorado pioneer and entrepreneur

Geography
Northey Island, island in the estuary of the River Blackwater, Essex, England

See also

Norther
Northerly
Northlea
Northney
Northway (disambiguation)